McConnaughay is a surname. Notable people with the surname include:

Karen McConnaughay (born 1957), American politician
Philip McConnaughay (born 1953), American academic administrator and jurist

See also
McConnaughey
Matthew McConaughey (born 1969), American actor, director, producer and writer
McConaughy